Benjamin Pratt (c. 1669–1721) was Provost of Trinity College Dublin from 1710 to 1717. He was later Dean of Down.

Life
Pratt was born in 1669 in Garradice, County Meath. He was the son of a landowner. In 1692, he graduated from Trinity College; the following year, he was elected Fellow. In 1710, Provost Peter Browne, after having been invited by the Queen, successfully recommended Pratt as Provost.

References

1660s births
1721 deaths
Provosts of Trinity College Dublin
Year of birth uncertain
People from County Meath